Great Sandy Bottom Pond is a  reservoir in Pembroke, Massachusetts. The reservoir is located south of Oldham Pond and Furnace Pond, and north of Little Sandy Bottom Pond. The reservoir is a Class A public water supply for the Abington/Rockland Joint Water Works.

External links
Environment Protection Agency
South Shore Coastal Watersheds - Lake Assessments

Reservoirs in Massachusetts
Lakes of Plymouth County, Massachusetts
Pembroke, Massachusetts
Buildings and structures in Plymouth County, Massachusetts
Protected areas of Plymouth County, Massachusetts